MyToons was an online business that developed a free online community for animation that supported content sharing and social networking. MyToons.com was headquartered in San Antonio, Texas.

The site was founded in 2006 by Paul Ford, Stacey Ford and Dan Kraus as a spinoff of Bauhaus Software. The Texas Emerging Technology Fund supported it with a $500,000 grant.

After four months of private beta, the site launched publicly in March 2007 during the South by Southwest festival in Austin, Texas, and began distributing member-created animation videos to Internet audiences worldwide. Three weeks after its launch, MyToons had received more than 1.5 million unique visitors.

Milestones 

In June 2008, MyToons.com became the first global animation community to offer users the ability to upload and view animations in High Definition.  At this time, the HD animation contest Get With the Times! was also launched.

In January 2009, MyToons laid off a large part of its staff.

In April 2009, MyToons closed down completely after venture capital funding ceased.

Affiliates 

 Adobe – Sponsor of Get with the Times! contest, June 2008 
 Adobe Media Player (AMP) Channel Partner, March 2008
 MonsterJam Animation Contest – Co-Sponsor, May 2008
 Warner Bros., Entertainment – Contest Partner, May 2008
 The Second Annual Animation Book Look – Co-Sponsor, May 2008
 Google – Google Search Appliance (GSA), April 2008 
 YouTube Channel Partner, February 2008
 DRAW Exhibit, London – Co-Sponsor, March 2008
 IMAX – Contest Partner, February 2008
 Krispy Kreme – Contest Partner, February 2008
 35th Annual Annie Awards, Hollywood, CA – Silver Sponsor and After-Party Entertainment Sponsor, February 2008
 Animation Army – Monthly Meetings Sponsor, 2007 – 2008
 INTERspectacular Design and Concept Studio – Bumper Blastoff! contest partner, December 2007
 Best In The Southwest Flash Animation Festival – Gold Sponsor, Albuquerque NM, October 2007
 Los Angeles Animation Festival (L.A.A.F.) – Major Sponsor, October 2007
 Animators: Andrew Gordon, Mike Wellins, Rusty Mills – Bust In and Win! contest Judges, September 2007
 Ottawa International Animation Festival – Major Sponsor and Panel Speaker, September 2007
 Anime Expo – Event, Promotions and Panel Speaker, June – July 2007
 Kalamazoo Animation Festival International (KAFI) – Bronze Sponsor, May 2007
 Limelight Networks – Flash Video Streaming Infrastructure, April 2007
 Draw/MyToons Launch – Platinum Sponsor for DRAW exhibit & Gallery Lombardi, SXSW Austin, TX, March 2007

References

External links 
MyToons Official Site

Internet properties established in 2007
Internet properties disestablished in 2009
Companies based in San Antonio
Animation organizations
Online advertising
Defunct social networking services
Online companies of the United States